Charlottetown Police Service (CPS) is the police service for the city of Charlottetown, Prince Edward Island, Canada. The service currently has 74 officers and 14 staffers. It is headed by Chief Brad MacConnell.

Programs and services
CPS programs and services includes:

 Accident Reconstruction Team
 Administration 
 Bylaw Enforcement 
 Court Office
 Criminal investigation branch
 Drug Investigations
 Emergency Response Team (E.R.T.)
 Identification Section (Forensics)
 Joint Forces (with the Royal Canadian Mounted Police (RCMP))
 Major Crime Unit
 Operational Records Clerks
 Parking Section
 Property 
 Street Crime Unit
 Tactical Troop (Riot squad)
 Telecoms Section 
 Traffic section
 Uniform Patrol

The force has also been involved in United Nations peacekeeping and the National Weapons Enforcement Support Team (NWEST).

History
In 1973 Charlottetown City Council voted for all police officers to carry firearms.

In 2019, it was reported that while the rest of the country's police services were struggling to boost recruitment, such as the RCMP with as many as a thousand vacancies, the CPS was received applications from across the country and around the world, with a 100:1 ratio in applicants to open positions. On October 29, 2021, the service added seven new officers, the largest hiring in 26 years.

Controversy
A unnamed adult female lodged a complaint with the service in 2018 alleging that on multiple occasions, she had engaged in sexual activities with an officer in his police vehicle while on duty. She further alleged that on multiple occasions, the officer ignored requests for back-up from other officers over the radio so that they could continue their assignations. In her complaint, she also claimed that he was not the only officer she had sexual encounters with, while on duty in police vehicles. The service announced it had launched an internal investigation for discreditable conduct.

Agency Executive
The service is currently led by a Chief of Police, prior to that it was led by a City Marshal

Chiefs of Police
Brad MacConnell, 2021–present
Paul Smith, 1994–2021
Don Webster, 1988-1994
Charles Ready, 1979-1988
Don Saunders, 1974-1979
Sterns Webster, 1963-1974
C.W. MacArthur, 1949-1963
A. Birtwhistle, 1927-1949

City Marshals
Wallace Shaw, 1925-1927
Charles Cameron, 1888-1925
George Passmore, 1880-1888
Thomas Flynn, 1869-1880
Angus MacLeod, 1862-1869
James Evans, 1857-1862
Michael O'Hara, 1855–1857

References

External links
 Charlottetown Police Department

1855 establishments in Prince Edward Island
Politics of Charlottetown
Law enforcement agencies of Prince Edward Island
Organizations established in 1855